No Time is a song by Scottish rock band Whiteout, released as their debut single in 1994. Whiteout performed the song live on Channel 4's popular TV series The Word on 28 January 1994. Later that year, "No Time" also appeared as the title track on an EP of the same name which was released exclusively in Japan. In February 1995, the track was released once again as part of the full-length album Bite It. The B-side "U Drag Me" is also featured on that album, but in a different version as the one included on this single.

Track listing
CD and 12" vinyl:
"No Time" – 3:55
"U Drag Me" (version) – 4:44
"Get Me Through" – 3:25

7" vinyl and cassette:
"No Time" – 3:55
"Get Me Through" – 3:25

All songs written by Carroll/Lindsay/Smith/Jones

Personnel
Andrew Jones – vocals
Eric Lindsay – guitar, backing vocals
Paul Carroll – bass, backing vocals
Stuart Smith – drums

Additional personnel
Phil Kane – Hammond organ and piano on "No Time"

Production
Production: Kenny Paterson and Oransay Avenue
Engineering and mix: Kenny Paterson at Park Lane Studio
Mastering: Porkey's
Cover design: Fin (original concept: George Miller)

Chart positions

References

Whiteout (band) songs
1994 singles